George LaVoo is a US film director, producer, and screenwriter. Real Women Have Curves, for which he was both producer and screenwriter, won the 2002 Sundance Film Festival Dramatic Audience Award. In 2006, he wrote Blood Monkey, and his 2008 film A Dog Year was shown at the Tribeca Film Festival. Lavoo is now working as a professor at the School of Visual Arts in New York City.

References

External links
 

Year of birth missing (living people)
Living people
American film directors
American film producers
American male screenwriters